It may refer to:

 Mary Poppins (book series), the original 1934–1988 children's fantasy novels that introduced the character.
 Mary Poppins (character), the nanny with magical powers.
 Mary Poppins (film), a 1964 Disney film starring Julie Andrews, based on the books.
 Mary Poppins: Original Cast Soundtrack, the soundtrack album for the 1964 film.
Mary Poppins Returns, a 2018 film starring Emily Blunt, and sequel to the 1964 film.
Mary Poppins Returns (soundtrack), the soundtrack album for the 2018 film.
Mary Poppins, Goodbye, a 1983 Soviet musical film released by MOs film.
 Mary Poppins (musical), a 2004 British stage musical based on the books and film.

See also

 
 
 Mary Poppins, or MAPO (US patent 3,973,746), the moving blocklight system that maintains spacing on Disney World monorail trains